is a 1991 video game developed by K2 and published by Takeru for the Famicom. A version for the PC Engine was announced, but was not released.

Gameplay 

Cocoron is a side-scrolling action game. It features full character customization, allowing players to build a character from a toy box filled with spare parts.

Development 

Cocoron was directed by Akira Kitamura, who had previously designed the character Mega Man. Kitamura had left Capcom to form the company Takeru. The score was created by Takashi Tateishi, who also did the music to Mega Man 2. According to Tateishi, Kitamura requested "more cutesy" music for the game than previous titles. The artist for the game was Takashi "Utata Kiyoshi" Kogure.

Capcom wanted to release Mega Man 3 to market before Cocoron, and they refused to delay the title despite internal problems of production.

Release 

The game was released in Japan on May 3, 1991.

A port of the game to the PC-Engine, titled PC Cocoron was announced. It was previewed in various magazines, including Weekly Famitsu, and Console Plus #28. Ultimately however, it was not released, and a copy of PC Cocoron is the possession of the Game Preservation Society.

Reception 

Japanese gaming magazine Famitsu gave it a score of 26 out of 40.

Family Computer Magazine readers voted to give it a 19.7 out of 30 score.

Wired writer Chris Kohler called the game boring, repetitive, and difficult.

Notes

References

External links 
 Cocoron at GameFAQs
 Cocoron at Giant Bomb
 Cocoron at MobyGames

1991 video games
Cancelled TurboGrafx-16 games
Japan-exclusive video games
Nintendo Entertainment System games
Nintendo Entertainment System-only games
Platform games
Video games about toys
Video games developed in Japan
Single-player video games
Sentient toys in fiction